Out of the Darkness may refer to:

Film and television 
Out of the Darkness (1915 film), an early American silent film.
Out of the Darkness (1971 film), a Thai science fiction musical action drama film directed by Chatrichalerm Yukol
Out of the Darkness (1978 film), an American film
Out of the Darkness (1985 film), a 1985 television film about the detective who tracked down the murderer Son of Sam
Out of the Darkness, a 2011 feature-length documentary about the ex-porn star Shelley Lubben
 Out of the Darkness (:da:De forbandede år), a 2022 Danish film directed by Anders Refn

Music 
Out of the Darkness (Jack Starr album), 1984
Out of the Darkness, a 2012 album by A Sound of Thunder
Out of the Darkness (Sacred Mother Tongue album), 2013
"Jerusalem" (Out of Darkness Comes Light), a 2006 song by Hasidic Jewish reggae singer Matisyahu
(1987–1989) Out of the Darkness – Into the Light, a 1991 album by Glam-metal band Lillian Axe
Out of the Darkness (Retrospective: 1994–1999), a 2006 studio album by Midnight Syndicate
Out of the Darkness, Into the Light, a 1998 compilation album by Dolomite
"Reach out of the Darkness", a 1968 single by the band Friend & Lover

Books 
Babylon 5: Legions of Fire – Out of the Darkness, a 1998 novel by Peter David
Out of the Darkness (Hinton novel), a teenage novel by Nigel Hinton
Out of the Darkness (Turtledove novel), by Harry Turtledove is the sixth and final book in the Darkness series

Other uses 
Out of the Darkness (Community and Overnight Walks), benefit events for the American Foundation for Suicide Prevention